The Shanghai International Table Tennis Tournaments were two friendly table tennis tournaments that took place in Shanghai in 1976 and 1980. They were organized by the Chinese Table Tennis Association.

Medalists

Men's singles

Women's singles

Men's doubles

Women's doubles

Mixed doubles

Men's team

Women's team

References 
https://home.kaiqiu.cc/home/space-335067-do-blog-id-159303.html 
https://home.kaiqiu.cc/home/space-335067-do-blog-id-159304.html 

Table tennis competitions in China